The 2001 NAPA Auto Parts 300 was a NASCAR Busch Series race held on February 17, 2001, Contested over 120 laps, on the  asphalt superspeedway. It was the first race of the 2001 NASCAR Busch Series season.

Results

Media

Television 
The NAPA Auto Parts 300 was carried by FOX in the United States. Mike Joy, former Cup Series champion Darrell Waltrip, and former Daytona 500 winner race crew chief Larry McReynolds called the race from the booth, with Steve Byrnes, Jeanne Zelasko, Dick Berggren and Matt Yocum covering pit road. Chris Myers hosted the show and there was also contributions from Jeff Hammond and Ken Squier. It was the first NASCAR Busch Series race broadcast on FOX as part of the new for 2001 TV contracts.

References 

2001 in NASCAR
2001 in sports in Florida
NASCAR races at Daytona International Speedway
2001 NASCAR Busch Series